This article contains a list of fossil-bearing stratigraphic units in the state of Utah, U.S.

Sites

See also

 Paleontology in Utah

References

 

Utah
Stratigraphic units
Stratigraphy of Utah
Utah geography-related lists
United States geology-related lists